Devilish Impressions is a Polish avant-garde black metal band. Considered one of Poland's leading metal acts Devilish Impressions officially started in 2000 as a three-piece, with founding singer / guitarist Quazarre the only remaining original member. Squeezing a unique dimension of brutality and catchiness into their music the band keeps pushing boundaries further out with each consecutive release.

Early years
Marking their presence with the 45-minutes-long Eritis sicut Deus; Verbum Diaboli Manet in Aeternum; Vox Vespertilio Act I – Moon Var Dies Irae, self-released in 2002, the band began the process of shaping up its own spirit.

2005 saw them recording "Plurima Mortis Imago", released in September 2006 on the London-based Conquer Records. The video for the song "SataniChaoSymphony" was shot in London and two months later Devilish Impressions hits the road along with Aeternus as part of the European "Ageless Void Tour". In April 2007 they land a direct support slot on Marduk's "Swords In The East" Eastern European run.

Diabolicanos – Act III: Armageddon and Extensive Touring 

After the successful tours, in May 2007 the group enters Studio X for the 3-months-long recording session of their second full-length album "Diabolicanos – Act III: Armageddon". While the record was being mastered by Andy Classen at Stage One Studio, Devilish Impressions appears at Red Alert Festival in the Crimea, accompanying such acts as Suffocation and Vader.

Autumn 2007 sees Devilish Impressions shooting the video for the song "Har-Magedon", set to promote the "Diabolicanos..." album. At the end of the year, the band sets off for the "Verbum Diaboli Tour", their first ever headlining run across the Eastern European countries.

The "Diabolicanos..." album, released in January 2008 again on Conquer Records, was widely praised in the international metal press and gave Devilish Impressions the opportunity to open for Behemoth and Suicide Silence on "The Apostasy European Tour", and then embark with Dismember for the "UK, Ireland and Northern Ireland Tour". Meanwhile, the group was invited for selected shows of Wacken Road Show 2008 yet, due to above-mentioned tours having been booked earlier, they eventually managed to join the WRS bill, Overkill, Tristania, Samael and Enslaved, for a show in Kiev only.

In May 2008 the album comes out in Poland licensed to Empire Records. The same month sees Devilish Impressions joining forces with their home country-mates Hate for their first time ever Polish invasion named "Rebel Angels Tour" being forced to drop off from the tour's last date, as they had earlier been booked for the special show with Satyricon in Ukraine.

The summer of 2008 included the band's appearance at Pro Rock Festival while co-headlining with Rage and at Metal Heads Mission Festival with bands like Moonspell, Gorgoroth and Samael to name but a few.

After finishing over a half-year-long touring cycle in support to the "Diabolicanos..." album, Devilish Impressions decide to continue their crusade, despite facing many problems on both, professional and personal levels, leading to further shifts in their line-up and temporary stage absence.

Simulacra and Fear No Gods of the East Tour 

In the middle of 2009, Quazarre began to compose on what would later become the "Diabolicanos..." successor, introducing even more of a thrash and heavy metal influences in the song-writing process, and thus injecting a new dimension of brutality and catchiness in Devilish Impressions' music. Increasing the use of clean vocals and further development of a melodic side of the new songs, made their sound even more of an epic character, sound that eventually turn into something the band themselves would describe as "MUSIC for the EXTREME experiMENTAL generation ONLY".

In the second half of 2010 Devilish Impressions enters few recording studios, incl. Studio X and Hertz Studio in order to produce their latest full-length named "Simulacra". The long-lasting recording session backed up by session synth appearances of Flumen (Asgaard) and Lestath (METransmissionAL), as well as special guests incl. Orion (Behemoth, Vesania), Jacek Grecki (Lost Soul) and Roman (Lecter), resulted in extremely sharp and massive sound of the album, that along with the new songs' outstanding craftsmanship, breath-taking artworks and lyrical concept based on works of the world's famous poets makes the "Simulacra" record one of the 2012 must-have metal offers.

Releasing the album in 2012 on several record labels: Lifeforce Records (Europe / North America), Icaros Records (Poland), MSR Productions (Russia / CIS countries), resulted also in signing the worldwide deal with The Flaming Arts Management and Booking Agency.

Nominated for a 2012 Metal Storm Award "Simulacra" was voted one of the Best Melodic Black Metal / Metalgaze Album and gets very good press all over the world.

In support to the record the group appears at a bunch of summer festivals, incl. Hard Rock Laager (with Samael, Melechesh), Carpathian Alliance (co-headlining with Dark Funeral, Carpathian Forest, Týr, Arkona), Castle Party and Brutal East, followed by "Fear no Gods of The East Tour 2013", a month-long headlining run across The Baltic States / Eastern European countries. After the tour Devilish Impressions plays at Wave Gotik Treffen (with Paradise Lost, Lacrimosa) and at MetalFest Open Air Poland (with Helloween, Accept, Sodom, Destruction, Down, Satyricon).

Adventvs 

During the Summer of 2013 the band re-enters Hertz Studio for the drums recording session of what is now known as "Adventvs" EP. Several months later, having the material mixed and mastered by Arkadiusz "Malta" Malczewski at Sound Division Studio, the band decides to re-master their 2002 never-published-before demo "Eritis Sicvt Devs" to eventually add it up to the new tracks portraying the band's re-defined sonic path. Released in May 2014 "Adventvs" features over an hour of both the band's new and old music - Experimental Black Death Metal at its best.

In support to its premiere Devilish Impressions hit the road for a headliner tour across Poland. Soon after the material got the attention of the now-legendary Hammerheart Records that released a 12’’ MLP in February 2015.

Soon after that the band hit the road once again, spreading their message across the motherland as part of the tour with Christ Agony and Beheaded. Shortly after, the band appeared at NCM Festival Vol. 4 (co-headliner w/ Vader) and Dark Fest II (w/ Vader, Decapitated, Hate and more). This left the passion raging on all levels and gave Devilish Impressions an easy return to the studio in May 2015 to commence the recording sessions for "The I" - the band's fourth full-length album which is said to be their darkest, heaviest and most intriguing offering to date.

The I and a new chapter

Right after finishing the recording process of the upcoming album, Devilish Impressions announced a long-awaited tour for their legion of fans in China and Taiwan supporting the "Simulacra" record, released in China through Mort Productions in September 2016. The trek lasted for nearly a month.

At the same time the band joins the elite roster of New York-based Extreme Management Group, Inc. alongside notable bands such as Suffocation, Cattle Decapitation, Origin, Cryptopsy, Atheist, Rings Of Saturn, King Parrot, Internal Bleeding to name but a few. This newfound partnership has both the band and the management hard at work on all the vital arrangements for the new album to make the impact intended.

Band members

Current members 
 Przemysław "Quazarre" Olbryt - vocals, guitars, keyboards (2000–present) 
 Jakub "Isemal" Bogatko - guitar (2018–present) 
 Adam "Avernatvs" Niekrasz - drums (2018–present)

Former members 
 Łukasz "Icanraz" Sarnacki - drums (2006–2018) 
 Marcin "Vraath" Majewski - bass (2009–2018)
 Armers - guitars (2006-2012)
 Turqouissa - keyboards (2000-2008)
 Starash - guitars, bass (2000-2007)
 Adrian Nefarious - bass ('Plurima Mortis Imago' recording session 2005)
 Dragor - drums ('Plurima Mortis Imago' recording session 2005)

 Former live members
 Exile - guitar (2012, 2015)
 I-gore - guitar (2014)
 Domin - guitar (2013) 
 Cloud - drums (2007)
 Cultus - bass (2007-2008)

Timeline

Discography

Studio albums
Plurima Mortis Imago (2006)
Diabolicanos – Act III: Armageddon (2008)
Simulacra (2012)
The I (2017)

EPs
Adventvs / Eritis sicvt Devs CD (2014)
Adventvs MLP (2015)
Postmortem Whispering Crows (2019)

Demos
Eritis sicut Deus; Verbum Diaboli Manet in Aeternum; Vox Vespertilio Act I – Moon Var Dies Irae (2002)

References

External links
Devilish Impressions Official website
Devilish Impressions Reverbnation profile

Polish heavy metal musical groups
Polish black metal musical groups
Musical groups established in 2000
Polish musical trios